Mågelibanen was a funicular with double track line arranged on a timber trestle work in Skjeggedal in Odda, Hordaland, Norway. The Mågelibanen was part of an industrial landscape connected to the listed hydroelectric power station in Tyssedal and the industry in the city of Odda.

History
The funicular was later used for supervision and maintenance of mountain installations. The funicular has also been used for new hydroelectric constructions in the area.

Upgrading
In connection to the 50th anniversary of AS Tyssefaldene in 1956 the funicular was upgraded and given as gift from the company to the people of Tyssedal. When the funicular opened, it made the spectacular rock formation Trolltunga and the attractive mountain plateau of Hardangervidda accessible to the public.

Recent history
The funicular was modernized in 1988. From the late 1990s to the beginning of the 2000s the funicular was also used for tourist transportation. A road to Mågelitopp was planned which conflicted with the track line of Mågelibanen. The transportation license ended in 2010 and the funicular closed permanently. The middle section of track has been removed and the remainder is in a poor state of repair. The road consists of a series of switchbacks, several of which cross the former location of the rails.

Technical data
Track length: 
Height: 
Horizontal length: 
Maximum steepness: 42°
Configuration: Two parallel straight tracks 
Journey time: 12 minutes
Speed:   
Cars: 2
Car weight:  
Track gauge: 
Traction: Electricity

See also 
 List of funicular railways

External links
 Mågelibanen - Roller coaster from wilderness
 Movie
 Statkraft

Odda
1912 establishments in Norway
800 mm gauge railways in Norway
Funicular railways in Norway
Railway lines opened in 1912